Propaganda is a 1999 Turkish comedy film written, directed and produced Sinan Çetin. The film, which is a darkly surreal comedy set in a sleepy village in the southeast Turkey in 1948, starred popular comedy actor Kemal Sunal, who died a year later in 2000.

Production
The film was shot on location in Hatay, Turkey.

Synopsis
Based on a true story set in 1948, customs officer Mehti is faced with the duty of formally setting up the border between Turkey and Syria, dividing his hometown. He is unaware of the pain that will imminently unfold, as families, languages, cultures and lovers are both ripped apart and clash head on in a village once united.

Cast
 Kemal Sunal as Mehdi
 Metin Akpınar as Rahim
 Meltem Cumbul as Filiz
 Rafet El Roman as Âdem
 Meral Orhonsay as Şahane
 Ali Sunal as Mahmut
 Nazmiye Oral as Azamet
 Müge Oruçkaptan as Nazmiye
 Berfi Dicle as Melek
 Kenan Baydemir as Hamdi
 Nail Kırmızıgül as Kopuk Yaşar
 Turgay Aydın as Cemil
 Cem Safran as Abuzer
 Zaven Çiğdemoğlu as Deli Selami
 Baycan Baybur as Komiser Muavini
 Ayşegül Yurdakul as Köylü Kadın
 Cengiz Deveci as Belediye Başkanı
 Özcan Pehlivan as Asker
 Bahar Uçan as Şadiye
 Sultan Yılmaz as Rahim'in Annesi
 Ahmet Tok as Genç Köylü
 Üzeyir Tok as Selcuk
 Turgut Giray as Cemil
 Sinan Çetin as Sheakespeare

Release

Festival screenings
 4th Shanghai International Film Festival (October 22–31, 1999)
 18th Istanbul International Film Festival

Reception

Awards
 Won: 4th Shanghai International Film Festival Golden Goblet
 Won: Bogey Award

References

External links
 
 

1999 films
1999 comedy-drama films
1990s Turkish-language films
Films set in 1948
Films set in Turkey
Comedy-drama films based on actual events
Films shot in Turkey
Turkish comedy-drama films